In the Republic of Crimea, the Attorney General's office is known as Prosecutor General's office, hence the name of the role or position. 

The Prosecutor General of the Republic of Crimea is the prosecutor and attorney who represents the Republic of Crimea in all civil and criminal matters in which it is a party or has an interest, and which are handled on appeal or in any other manner in the courts of Crimea, Russia, or its territories or possessions. The prosecutor reports directly to the Head of the Republic of Crimea and leads the Office of the Prosecutor General of the Republic of Crimea.

List

References

Notes

External links

Politics of Crimea
Judiciary of Russia